Fidel is a 2002 mini-series by David Attwood that describes the Cuban revolution and political career of Fidel Castro (played by Víctor Huggo Martin). The total duration of the film is 200 minutes, but the video-version is shorter. Gael García Bernal would later reprise his role as Che Guevara in the film The Motorcycle Diaries.

Plot
The film is almost documentary in its portrayal of facts. It claims to be based strongly on facts, apart from some adaptations like merging various characters into one.

After two hours, the film changes dramatically. The first two hours are about the six years before the fall of Batista's dictatorship. The last hour is about the 40 years after that.

In the first two hours, Castro regularly distances himself from Communism and Communists, but after the take-over, the film suggests that Castro had always aspired a Marxist-Leninist State.

Cast

Terminology
Being a US film, it uses US terminology, such as use of the word Communism instead of Socialism, which is the word used in Cuba (the goal may be Communism, but the method is Socialism). There is, though, nuance to take into account: the Cuban communist party was called People's Socialist Party (PSP), but the Cubans did refer to them as "communists". Also, the US is referred to as 'America' and the continent as 'the Americas', whereas the term 'America' is in Cuba reserved for the Continent (e.g. in one of the historical recordings that are shown, the crowd chants 'Cuba si, Yankee no', not 'Cuba yes, America no').

Historical characters
Along with Fidel Castro, Che Guevara and Fulgencio Batista, over a dozen other historical characters are featured, including: 
 Celia Sanchez
 Camilo Cienfuegos
 Eduardo Chibas
 Raúl Castro
 Huber Matos
 Herbert Matthews
 Abel Santamaria and his sister Haydee Santamaria
 US Ambassador Robert Butler

References

External links

Estudios Churubusco films
2002 television films
2002 films
Biographical films about revolutionaries
Films set in Cuba
Cultural depictions of Fidel Castro
Films shot in the Dominican Republic
Films with screenplays by Stephen Tolkin
Films directed by David Attwood (film director)